Arbërisht refers to two subdialects of the Tosk dialect of the Albanian language:
 Arvanitika, spoken by the Arvanites in Greece
 Arbëresh language, spoken by the Arbëreshë in central and southern Italy